King Midas may refer to:

Midas, name of at least three members of the royal house of Phrygia (one of which had the mythological ability to turn anything he touched into gold)
King Midas, a 1996 song by Swedish band Army of Lovers
King Midas (band), a Norwegian musical group
King Midas Sound, a musical project by British musician Kevin Martin
"King Midas In Reverse", song by British group The Hollies